Yahia Boushaki (1935 – 28 December 1960), commonly known as Si Omar or simply as Boushaki, was a prominent revolutionary leader during the Algerian war of independence as a member of the Front de Libération Nationale (FLN; National Liberation Front) that launched an armed revolt throughout Algeria and issued a proclamation calling for a sovereign Algerian state.

Education

Boushaki was born in 1935 in the village of Soumâa south of the present city of Thenia, about 50 km east of the great city of Algiers, and his Sufi family descends from the Malikite theologian Sidi Boushaki (1394-1453), who founded the Zawiyet Sidi Boushaki in 1440 during the 15th century.

His grandfather Ali Boushaki (1855-1965) was Muqaddam of Tariqa Rahmaniyyah in Lower Kabylia and his paternal and maternal uncles were Muslim imams as were his cousins.

He then received a religious education according to the Algerian Islamic reference as well as a political consciousness according to the ideology of Algerian independence nationalism through his paternal uncle Mohamed Seghir Boushaki (1869-1959), who was an elected municipal councilor from 1919 to 1939.

In addition to his academic activity in this Sufi environment under the immediate patronage of Imam Brahim Boushaki (1912-1997), he worked in agriculture and animal husbandry near the surrounding villages of Meraldene, Tabrahimt, Gueddara, Azela and Mahrane.

Political activity 
From his adolescence, his desire to join the ranks of clandestine separatist activities within the Algerian nationalism was clearly manifested.

It was inspired by the failure of the political activities advocated by the political process that followed the proclamation of the 30th petition for Civil and political rights on July 18, 1920, which sought to obtain these rights of the indigenous Algerians at the same time, on an equal footing with European settlers in Algeria, and whose failure was consummated by the massacres of May 1945.

He then joined the Movement for the Movement for the Triumph of Democratic Liberties (MTLD) and the Special Organization (OS) to prepare the insurrection against French colonialism.

Military combat 

As soon as the Algerian revolution broke out, he joined the ranks of the National Liberation Front (FLN) as a political commissar, and the National Liberation Army (ALN) as a soldier and later as a military officer in Kabylia and in Mitidja plain.

Captain Boushaki initiated extensive sabotage operations of colonial properties and participated with his soldiers in several battles between Thenia and Bouira against French paratroopers, resulting in the destruction of several combat aircraft belonging to the French Air Force.

He synchronized his operations in concert with the command of the military region based in the Zbarbar forest where his friend the journalist Mohamed Aïchaoui (1921-1959) was entrenched.

Death 
Boushaki prepared in the Blida Province with a command of the National Liberation Army (ALN) an operation against the French Armed Forces during the month of December 1960 in order to deconfine the repressive pressure against the mujahideen maquis east of Algiers, Mitidja and Kabylie.

Thus, while captain of a  unit, he was killed in combat in Meftah on December 28, 1960, during the battle of Souakria along with Abdelkader Madjène and other Mujahideen, the rest of the unit blending in with the surrounding maquis.

Tributes 

He gave his name to an important district of Algiers north of the El Alia Cemetery in the municipality of Bab Ezzouar and which bears the name of the Chinatown named Yahia Boushaki.

A promotion of officers of the Algerian People's National Army (ANP) was named the Yahia Boushaki Promotion in 1995 during their training at the École Supérieure de la Défense Aérienne du Territoire (ESDAT). Four promotions of officers of the Gendarmerie Nationale (GN) were appointed Promotions of Yahia Boushaki as of June 16, 2008.

General  (1936-2019), accompanied by various ministers of the Algerian government, personally bestowed the name of Yahia Boushaki on the active elements of these four promotions.

See also 
 Yahia Boushaki (neighbourhood in Algiers)
 Yahia Boushaki Boulevard (boulevard in Thénia)
 Yahia Boushaki tram stop (tram stop in Algiers)
 List of Algerians

References

1935 births
1960 deaths
People from Thénia
People from Thénia District
People from Boumerdès Province
Algerian Sufis
Kabyle people
Boushaki family
Deaths in Algeria
Zawiyet Sidi Boushaki alumni
Violent deaths in Algeria
Deaths by firearm in Algeria
Algerian revolutionaries
Executed revolutionaries
Executed Algerian people
Indigenous activists of Africa
People of the Algerian War
Members of the National Liberation Front (Algeria)
Muslim martyrs
Muslims killed in battle
Military personnel killed in action
Algerian military personnel
Members of the National Liberation Army (Algeria)
Algerian resistance leaders
National Heroes of Algeria
Algerian political people
Arab politicians
National Liberation Front (Algeria) politicians
People executed by France by firearm
Burials in Algeria